Koure may refer to:
 Koure, Guinea, a small town on the outskirts of Conakry
 Kouré, Niger, a rural community noted for its giraffe population
 Gouré, Chad, a community near lake Iro

See also 
 Kouri (disambiguation)
 Kaure (disambiguation)